The Kulim District is a district and town in the state of Kedah, Malaysia. It is located on the southeast of Kedah, bordering Penang.

History
The Kulim's independence clock was officiated by the Sultan of Kedah (15 September 1957) and serves as the unofficial landmark for the town of Kulim.

Administrative divisions
Kulim District is divided into 15 mukims, which are:

Demographics

Government

All parts of Kulim District are administered by Kulim Municipal Council, formerly Kulim District Council, except for the Hi-Tech Park which is administered by a special local authority. Kulim District Council was formed on 1 February 1978 through the merger of Kulim Town Board and Council and the Padang Serai, Junjung, Mahang and Merbau Pulas Local Councils.

Economy
Kulim District is currently most notable for its flagship high technology industrial park Kulim Hi-Tech Park.

In March 2019, Economic Affairs Minister Azmin Ali announced the Federal Government's approval to invest MYR 1.6 billion (~USD 380 million) to build the proposed Kulim International Airport. In August 2019, it was announced that the proposed 17 km2 airport will have two runways, which will be able to cater to 60 flight movements per hour, or one flight landing/take-off per minute.

Notable natives
 Ismail Omar, Chairman of New Straits Times Press, former Inspector-General of Royal Malaysian Police, and former Malaysian Ambassador to France.
 Gary Steven Robbat, professional football player for Johor Darul Takzim F.C.
 Suppiah Chanturu, professional football player for Johor Darul Takzim F.C.
 Muhammad Akram Mahinan, professional football player for PKNS F.C.
 Abdul Halim Saari professional football player for Selangor FA and former player for Kedah FA.
 Dr. Jegajeeva Rao Subba Rao, Consultant Obstetrician and Gynaecologist, First recipient of the inaugural Prime Minister of Australia Asia Endeavour Award in 2010.

Federal Parliament and State Assembly Seats
List of Kulim district representatives in the Federal Parliament (Dewan Rakyat) 

List of Kulim district representatives in the State Legislative Assembly (Dewan Undangan Negeri)

See also
 Butterworth–Kulim Expressway
 Northern Corridor Economic Region
 Penang

References

External links

 
 Kulim’s Municipal Council Website
 Kulim 2035 Draft Plan

 
Northern Corridor Economic Region